No One Can Pronounce My Name is the second novel written by Rakesh Satyal.

Publication
The first edition hard cover of No One Can Pronounce My Name was published in May 2017 by Picador. Paperback version of the book was published in May 2018.

References

2017 American novels
Picador (imprint) books